The Pace Is Glacial is the fourth and final studio album by the indie rock band Seam. It was released in 1998 on Touch and Go Records.

Critical reception
The Chicago Tribune wrote that Seam "distills its no-frills guitar rock into a tight collection of creeper melodies and haunting ruminations on who-knows-what that are nonetheless emotionally resonant." The Sunday Times thought that "while tiny fragments of noise circle the peripheries of 'Little Chang' and 'The Prizefighters', there's always a moment when the weirdness coalesces into an irresistible rock riff."

Track listing

Personnel 
Seam
Chris Manfrin – drums
Sooyoung Park – vocals, guitar
Reg Shrader – guitar
William Shin – bass guitar
Production and additional personnel
Rob Bochnik – engineering on "Aloha Spirit"
K. Kiyota – photography
Brian Paulson – recording
Jo Yu – backing vocals

References

External links 
 

1998 albums
Seam (band) albums
Touch and Go Records albums